Katherine Reback (1950/51 – May 24, 2010) was an American screenwriter, best known for the screenplay of the 1997 romantic comedy Fools Rush In and for penning the production draft of the 1983 film, Flashdance.

Reback was a native of Stamford, Connecticut. She received her bachelor's degree from Columbia University. She launched her career in the mid-1970s, while working for Alan King in New York City. Reback also began writing for such television shows as The Line and One Day at a Time.

In 1980, Reback relocated to California. In addition to screenwriting, Reback contributed to Bill Clinton's speech writing team during his 1992 presidential campaign.

Reback worked as a writer for Fox Television Studios for the last fifteen years of her life, until her death in 2010.

Katherine Reback died of cancer on May 24, 2010, in Los Angeles at the age of 59. She was survived by husband, Sonny King (the couple had been married for 15 years); three stepchildren; and a step-grandchild.

References

External links

1950s births
2010 deaths
American speechwriters
Columbia University alumni
Writers from Stamford, Connecticut
Deaths from cancer in California
Screenwriters from Connecticut